Roger Henri Vivier (13 November 1907 – 2 October 1998) was a French fashion designer who specialized in shoes. His best-known creation was the stiletto heel.

Career

Vivier has been called the "Fragonard of the shoe" and his shoes "the Fabergé of Footwear" by numbers of critics. He designed extravagant, richly decorated shoes that he described as sculptures. He is credited with the design of the first platform shoe in 1937 and the first stiletto heel in 1954. Stiletto heels, the very thin high heel, were certainly discovered around in the late 19th century, as numerous fetish drawings attest, but Vivier is known for reviving and developing this opulent style by using a thin rod of steel.

Ava Gardner, Gloria Guinness and The Beatles were all Vivier customers, and he designed shoes for Queen Elizabeth II for her coronation in 1953.

Vivier designed shoes for house Christian Dior from 1953 to 1963. In addition to the stiletto heel, he also experimented with other shapes, including the comma. He used silk, pearls, beads, lace, appliqué and jewels to create unique decorations for his shoes.

In the 1960s, Vivier also designed silk-satin knee boots outlined in jewels, and thigh-high evening boots in a black elastic knit with beads. Perhaps his best known boot design of the decade were the low-heeled, thigh-high, black crocodile boots he produced for Yves Saint Laurent's fall 1963 collection, paired with a Space Age-looking, all-black Saint Laurent ensemble of tights, suede jerkin, short ciré jacket, and helmet-like visored cap and hood, the boots a variation of a pair Vivier had designed for a Rudolph Nureyev performance of Swan Lake. His possibly most iconic shoe design of the decade, the low-heeled Pilgrim pumps with silver buckles produced for Yves Saint Laurent's 1965 Mondrian collection (worn by Catherine Deneuve in the film Belle de Jour) received international publicity and many imitations.

Vivier has a boutique on the Rue Faubourg Saint-Honoré, whose design is inspired by Vivier's apartment.  The collection is designed by Bruno Frisoni.  Exclusivity is the hallmark of the line, with many shoes made to order, some with hand-embroidered gold thread.  There are now three shops in the USA.  The latest opened in May 2012. Vivier's shoes are on display at the Costume Institute of the Metropolitan Museum of Art in New York, the Victoria and Albert Museum in London, the Bata Shoe Museum in Toronto and the Musée de la mode et du textile at the Louvre.

The brand has been owned by Diego Della Valle's company, Tod's, from 2006. As of November 2015, Tod's owns 60.7% in the shoe brand.

See also
 Ayush D. Khurana

References

External links

 
  Official website
 
 
 
 Exhibition (2014) in Germany (Deutsches Ledermuseum)
Kenneth Jay Lane collection of Roger Vivier designs, 1956–1961 from The Irene Lewisohn Costume Reference Library at the Costume Institute, The Metropolitan Museum of Art, New York.

French fashion designers
Shoe designers
1907 births
1998 deaths
French brands
LGBT fashion designers
20th-century French LGBT people